Games Domain was a video game website founded by Dave Stanworth and based in Birmingham, UK. In the late 1990s, it was at one time mirrored in seven countries and had a tumultuous history of being purchased by different corporations over its 11-year existence. It was active from March 1994 until March 2005. By 2002, the Domain was considered one of the leading gaming sites, with approximately 1.4 million users and 15 million page views per month. It also had two sister sites - Kids Domain, focusing on children's titles, and Console Domain, focusing on console games. The site's primary URLs were www.gamesdomain.co.uk (UK) and www.gamesdomain.com (US).

The site's main areas were the GD Review, an online magazine which consisted mostly of staff reviews and previews of games; the Downloads section, featuring game demos, patches, and shareware; and the Games Info section, with FAQs and walkthroughs.

History of ownership
In early 1998, Games Domain was acquired by The Attitude Network, which also hosted popular gaming site HappyPuppy.com. Theglobe.com, at the time a successful new web portal, purchased Attitude Network in a $52.8 million deal in April 1999.  By 2000, after acquiring games retailer Chips & Bits and Computer Games Magazine publisher Strategy Plus, theglobe.com was considered the second largest online gaming network. However, like several companies from the dotcom era, the company went bust within two years. Theglobe.com sold these operations in August 2001 and continued with a reduced games division consisting of just Computer Games Magazine and the Chips & Bits mail-order service until the present day.

The site had been up for sale since July 2001, and would not find a home until October of that year. BT Openworld, the internet arm of British Telecom, purchased Games Domain to boost its online gaming division. BT launched a new service on the site called Games Domain Multiplay in November 2001, providing servers for online gamers at a price. It was unsuccessful, and within 16 months the Multiplay service was shut down.

In November 2003, BT sold Games Domain to Yahoo!. The site would be integrated into Yahoo's softfields.com. During the Yahoo years, Games Domain was revamped visually and covered both console and PC games until Yahoo abandoned the brand and URL in March 2005.
https://www.softfields.com/

Organization hierarchy and its effect
From the early start and through its development up until the point of the theGlobe.com acquisition, Games Domain used a combinatorial management system incorporating internal office staff and external "online" managers to produce downloads and online publications. Dave Stanworth held the system together from his Birmingham office with programmers and some staff writers, while Games Domain Review internet writers from all over the world, showing talent and work ethic, were promoted to section editors of various gaming categories, called "Zones", such as Role Playing Games (RPG), Strategy, Sport, Adventure and Action. Under these Zone managers (editors) were various freelance game reviewers. Section editors had the job of coordinating game reviewers for their subcategory, and for writing monthly editorials as well as contributing game reviews. The initial philosophy of Games Domain Review was that a reviewer should complete the entire game, and write a lengthy, honest review, regardless of marketing influences. For this reason, Games Domain was initially considered unbiased in its reviews of various games.

Staff editors, responsible for their subcategories, were also involved in management decisions. Staff discussions were conducted via email, in a lengthy, sometimes intense process. This form of management reflected the pseudo-anarchical style of earlier internet developments, and was reflected in nearly all decisions regarding the presentation of Games Domain to the public, including the award of excellence such as a gold or silver medal to a computer game. Such an award was discussed among all editors and management, and regardless of the originating editor's opinion (who most likely reviewed the game personally) a consensus would or must be achieved. Endless debates were ignited via this system. Although entirely inefficient in most respects, the management system insured that game enthusiasts were, via debate and thorough peer review, providing readers with the optimal commentary on games and developments.

At the same time, when changes were deemed necessary due to marketing pressures such as the necessity for faster turn-around times, and then ultimately various acquisitions, the system proved inflexible and in part contributed both to the high success of Games Domain at the peak of the dotcom era, and then to its ultimate decline.

Editors
Although Games Domain has now been absorbed into Yahoo's games channel, as of March 2008 original GD Review editor Richard Greenhill still works for Yahoo and writes a regular editor's column.  He is joined by Mike Smith who worked out of Games Domain's Birmingham office for a number of years.

References

External links
 www.gamesdomain.co.uk at archive.org

Video game news websites
British entertainment websites
BT Group
Yahoo! acquisitions